Raorchestes rezakhani is a new species of cryptic bush frog (Anura, Rhacophoridae, Raorchestes) from northeastern Bangladesh and named after Mohammad Ali Reza Khan, a  ornithologist and wildlife conservationist. The research, collection, and identification tasks were done by two Bangladeshi researchers (Hasan Al Razi Chayan and Marjan Maria) from Jagannath University, Dhaka with support from Sabir Bin Muzaffar, Professor of Biology at United Arab Emirates University. The specimens are deposited in the Shahid Rafique Special Specimen Collection, Department of Zoology, Jagannath University, Dhaka.

References

rezakhani
Frogs of Bangladesh
Amphibians described in 2020